YFR may refer to:

 YFR - Refrigerated Cover Lighter a Hull classification symbol used by the United States Navy.
 YFR - Fort Resolution Airport in the Northwest Territories.
 YFR - Yeshiva of Far Rockaway, also called Yeshiva Derech Ayson, is a yeshiva in Far Rockaway, Queens.
 YFR - cYanobacterial Functional RNA such as Yfr1 and Yfr2